Neerasagar is a village in Dharwad district of Karnataka, India.

Demographics 
As of the 2011 Census of India there were 290 households in Neerasagar and a total population of 1,493 consisting of 803 males and 690 females. There were 213 children ages 0-6.

References

Villages in Dharwad district